Julio Medem Lafont (born 21 October 1958) is a Basque film director, producer, editor, and screenwriter.

Biography
Medem was born on 21 October 1958 in San Sebastián, Basque Country, Spain and showed an interest in movies since childhood, when he would take his father's Super 8 camera and shoot at night, while nobody was paying attention. After college graduation (where he earned degrees in Medicine and General Surgery) he worked as a film critic and later as a screenwriter, assistant director and editor. After a few shorts he directed his first full-length feature, Vacas ('Cows') for which he won a Goya Award.

After this film he directed The Red Squirrel and Earth, both receiving good reviews at Cannes. His next film, Lovers of the Arctic Circle, has been compared to the works of Krzysztof Kieślowski. In 2002 was released his following  film, Sex and Lucia.

Medem explored the documentary format with his next production La pelota vasca ('The Basque Ball'), a film about the political problems of the Basque Country, which caused a furor amongst some victims of terrorism and far right politicians. Following this, his film Caótica Ana debuted in 2007.

Filmography as director

Feature films

Narrative films 
 Cows (1991)
 The Red Squirrel (1993)
 Earth (1996)
 Lovers of the Arctic Circle (1998)
 Sex and Lucia (2001)
 Chaotic Ana (2007)
 Room in Rome (2010)
 7 days in Havana (2011) (Segment la tentacion de Cecilia)
 Ma Ma (2015)
 The Tree of Blood (2018)

Documentary film 
 The Basque Ball: Skin Against Stone (2003)

Short films

Super 8 
 El ciego (The Blind, 1974)
 El jueves pasado (Last Thursday, 1977)
 Fideos (Noodles, 1979)
 Si yo fuera poeta... (If I Were a Poet, 1981)
 Teatro en Soria (Theatre in Soria, 1982)

35 mm 
 Patas en la cabeza (Nutty As a Fruitcake, 1985)
 Las seis en punta (Six on the Dot, 1987)
 Martín (commissioned by TVE for their Siete huellas, siete [Seven Tracks, Seven] series of short films, 1988)
 El Diario Vasco (The Basque Daily, 1989)

DV 
 Asi se hizo "Airbag" (making of Juanma Bajo Ulloa's film Airbag, 1997)
 Clecla (commissioned by notodofilmfest.com, 2001)
 La pelota vasca (segment of ¡Hay motivo! [There Is Reason!], 2003)
 En las ramas de Ana (In Ana's Branches, commissioned by :es:Fotogramas and Nokia for their N_ature movies series of short films, 2007)
 Concha (Mussel, video installation commissioned by Acciona and shown at Expo 2008, 2008)

Music video 
 "Océano de sol" for Antonio Vega (1994)

Commercials 
 Runner for Audi's Attitudes campaign (agency: El Sindicato, 1999/2000)
 Soplo/Tendedero (Waft/Clothesline) and Mediterraneo (Mediterranean) for Balay (agency: FCB Tapsa, 2002)
 Vecina (Neighbour) and Brazalete (Bracelet) for Heineken (agency: Dayax, 2003)

Tv Series 

 Jai Alai ( 2023)

Books 

 Aspasia Amante De Atenas (2013)

Notes

Further reading 
 Stone, Rob: Julio Medem. Manchester 2007 (Spanish and Latin American Filmmakers)
 Evans, Jo: Julio Medem. London 2007 (Critical Guides to Spanish & Latin American Texts and Films; 71)
 Angulo, Jesús/Rebordinos, José Luis: Contra la certeza: El cine de Julio Medem. San Sebastián/Huesca 2005
 Ituarte Pérez, Leire: El imaginario posmoderno de la feminidad en la filmografía de Juanma Bajo Ulloa y Julio Medem. Bilbao 2007 (Tesis doctorales)
 Bochnig, Julia: ''Von der großen Sehnsucht zu fliehen": Die Filme von Julio Medem. Remscheid 2005 (Filmstudien; 37)
 Strigl, Sandra: Traumreisende: Eine narratologische Studie der Filme von Ingmar Bergman, André Téchiné und Julio Medem. Bielefeld 2007
 Rodriguez, Marie-Soledad (ed.): Le cinéma de Julio Medem. Paris 2008
 Falcioni, Davide: L'immagine eccessiva: Julio Medem e il suo universo magico. Bellocchi di Fano 2004 (Quaderni del Fano International Film Festival/Papermoon; 2)

External links 
 
 JulioMedem.org 

1958 births
Living people
People from San Sebastián
Film directors from the Basque Country (autonomous community)
Spanish documentary filmmakers
Spanish people of French descent
Spanish people of German descent
20th-century Spanish screenwriters
20th-century Spanish male writers
University of the Basque Country alumni
21st-century Spanish screenwriters